Nationality words link to articles with information on the nation's poetry or literature (for instance, Irish or France).

Events

Works published in English

United Kingdom
 Isabella Banks, Ivy Leaves, including "Neglected Wife"
 William Barnes, Poems of Rural Life in the Dorset Dialect
 Frances Browne, The Star of Atteghei; The Vision of Schwartz, and Other Poems
 Elizabeth Barrett (later Elizabeth Barrett Browning), Poems, including "A Drama of Exile" and ballads
 Sir Francis Hastings Doyle, The Two Destinies
 Frederick William Faber, Sir Lancelot
 Leigh Hunt, What is Poetry?, critical essay
 Monckton Milnes, Palm Leaves
 Coventry Patmore, Poems

United States
 Lydia Maria Child – "Over the River and Through the Wood"
 James Freeman Clarke, Hymn Book for the Church of the Disciples (expanded edition, 1852)
 Christopher Pearse Cranch, Poems
 Samuel Henry Dickson, Poems, including his popular "I Sigh for the Land of the Cypress and Pine"
 Ralph Waldo Emerson, The Poet an essay of literary criticism in Essays, Second Series
 Rufus Wilmot Griswold, The Poets and Poetry of England in the Nineteenth Century, anthology
 Charles Fenno Hoffman, The Echo
 William H. C. Hosmer, Yonnonidio, or Warriors of the Genesee
 Sarah Anna Lewis, Records of the Heart
 Henry Wadsworth Longfellow, editor, Poets and Poetry of Europe, anthology
 James Russell Lowell, Poems
 Epes Sargent, The Light of the Lighthouse and Other Poems
 Lydia Maria Child, Flowers for Children, Volume 2, including "Over the River and Through the Woods", which was later set to music
 Bayard Taylor, Ximena; or, The Battle of the Sierra Morena and Other Poems

Works published in other languages
 Aleardo Aleardi, l' Arnalda di Roca ("Rock of Arnalda"), Italy
 Heinrich Heine, German poet and author living in France:
 Neue Gedichte ("New Poems")
 Deutschland Ein Wintermarchen, long narrative poem on political and topics
 Frederik Paludan-Müller, Denmark:
 Dryadens bryllup ("The Dryad's Wedding")
 Tithon ("Tithonus")
 Abels Død ("The Death of Abel")
 Henrik Wergeland, Norway:
 Den Engelske Lods ("The English Pilot")
 Jødinden ("The Jewess")

Births
Death years link to the corresponding "[year] in poetry" article:
 February 8 – Richard Watson Gilder (died 1909), American poet and editor
 March 14 – Arthur O'Shaughnessy (died 1881), English poet and herpetologist
 March 30 – Paul Verlaine (died 1896), French Symbolistt poet
 March 31 – Andrew Lang (died 1912), Scottish writer
 June 28 – John Boyle O'Reilly (died 1890), Irish-born American poet, journalist and fiction writer
 July 21 – Matilda Maranda Crawford (died 1920), American-Canadian poet, writer, correspondent
 July 28 – Gerard Manley Hopkins (died 1889), English poet and Jesuit priest
 October 12 – George Washington Cable (died 1925), American novelist
 October 13 – Ernest Myers (died 1921), English poet and classicist
 October 23
Robert Bridges (died 1939), English Poet Laureate
Laura Rosamond White (died 1922), American poet, author, and editor
 November 12 – Ismail Merathi (died 1917), Indian poet from Mughal and British era
 November 21 – Ada Cambridge (died 1926), English writer and poet living in Australia after 1870
Date not known:
 Caroline Lindsay (died 1921), English
 Venmani Mahan Namboodiri (died 1893), Indian, Malayalam-language poet associated with the Venmani School of poetry
 Arabella Eugenia Smith (died 1916), American

Deaths
Death years link to the corresponding "[year] in poetry" article:
 March 6 – Sumner Lincoln Fairfield, (born 1803), American poet and teacher
 June 15  – Thomas Campbell (born 1777), Scottish poet especially of sentimental poetry dealing with human affairs
 November 21 – Ivan Krylov (1769), Russian fabulist
 Date not known – Margaret Miller Davidson, senior (born 1787), American novelist, mother of poets Lucretia Maria Davidson, Margaret Miller Davidson and Levi P. Davidson

See also

 19th century in poetry
 19th century in literature
 List of years in poetry
 List of years in literature
 Victorian literature
 French literature of the 19th century
 Biedermeier era of German literature
 Golden Age of Russian Poetry (1800–1850)
 Young Germany (Junges Deutschland) a loose group of German writers from about 1830 to 1850
 List of poets
 Poetry
 List of poetry awards

Notes

19th-century poetry

Poetry